Dimeh may refer to:

Settlements in Iran:
 Dimeh, Chaharmahal and Bakhtiari
 Dimeh Darb
 Dimeh-ye Ban Said
 Dimeh-ye Karim
 Dimeh-ye Shakraleh
 Dimeh Kuh-e Khayiz

Other places:
 Dimeh es-Seba, possibly meaning «Dimeh of the lions», the modern name for the archaeological site of Soknopaiou Nesos north of Birket Qarun lake, Egypt